The 2013–14 Honduran Liga Nacional season was the 48th Honduran Liga Nacional edition, since its establishment in 1965. For this season, the format remained as the previous season. The tournament began on 10 August 2013 and ended on 4 May 2014. Club Deportivo Olimpia was defending the championship after winning the 2012–13 competition.

2013–14 teams

A total of 10 teams will contest the league, including 9 sides from the 2012–13 season plus Parrillas One, promoted from the 2012–13 Liga de Ascenso.

Apertura

Regular season

Standings

Results
 Updated 10 November 2013

Postseason

Playoffs

Olimpia v Parrillas One

 Olimpia won 2–1 on aggregate score.

Deportes Savio v Platense

 Deportes Savio won 6–3 on aggregate score.

Semifinals

Real Sociedad v Deportes Savio

 Real Sociedad 3–3 Deportes Savio on aggregate score; Real Sociedad advanced on regular season record.

Real España v Olimpia

 Real España 1–1 Olimpia on aggregate score; Real España advanced on regular season record.

Final

Real Sociedad v Real España

 Real Sociedad 3–3 Real España on aggregate score; Real España won 1–3 on penalty shoot-outs.

Clausura

Regular season

Standings

Results
 Updated 13 April 2014

 Marathón–Real España suspended at '75 (1–6) as Marathón abandoned the game.  Result stood.

Postseason

Playoffs

Real España v Victoria

 Victoria won 4–2 on aggregate score.

Motagua v Marathón

 Marathón won 2–1 on aggregate score.

Semifinals

Olimpia v Victoria

 Olimpia won 2–0 on aggregate score.

Real Sociedad v Marathón

 Marathón won 1–0 on aggregate score.

Final

Olimpia v Marathón

 Olimpia 0–0 Marathón on aggregate score; Olimpia won 4–2 on penalty shoot-outs.

Top goalscorers
 Updated 4 May 2014
 24 goals:

  Rony Martínez (Real Sociedad)

 20 goals:

  Bryan Róchez (Real España)

 17 goals:

  Roger Rojas (Olimpia)

 16 goals:

  Anthony Lozano (Olimpia)

 15 goals:

  Javier Estupiñán (Platense / Parrillas One)
  Román Castillo (Vida / Motagua)

 13 goals:

  Romell Quioto (Vida / Olimpia)

 12 goals:

  Luis Ramírez (Deportes Savio / Marathón)

 11 goals:

  Julio de León (Platense)
  Claudio Cardozo (Real España)

 10 goals:

  Luis Lobo (Parrillas One)

 9 goals:

  Elkin González (Real Sociedad)
  Charles Córdoba (Parrillas One)
  Óscar Fortín (Deportes Savio)
  Diego Reyes (Real Sociedad / Marathón)
  Maximiliano Lombardi (Motagua)

 8 goals:

  Eddie Hernández (Vida)
  Rony Flores (Marathón / Victoria)

 7 goals:

  José Varela (Motagua)
  Romário Pinto (Deportes Savio)
  Carlos Discua (Motagua)
  Julio Rodríguez (Real España)
  Mario Martínez (Real España)
  Carlo Costly (Real España)

 6 goals:

  Kevin Hoyos (Victoria)
  Gerson Rodas (Real España)
  Leandro Guaita (Victoria)
  Fredixon Elvir (Victoria)
  Carlos Mejía (Olimpia)

 5 goals:

  Georgie Welcome (Motagua / Platense)
  Cholby Martínez (Vida)
  Henry Martínez (Real Sociedad)
  Juan Munguía (Real Sociedad)
  Omar Guerra (Olimpia)
  Horacio Parham (Parrillas One)
  Mario Berríos (Marathón)

 4 goals:

  Pastor Martínez (Deportes Savio)
  Clayvin Zúniga (Deportes Savio)
  Edder Delgado (Real España)
  Ian Osorio (Marathón)
  Pablo Vásquez (Olimpia)
  Jerrick Díaz (Platense)
  Elroy Smith (Platense)
  Jhovani Lasso (Deportes Savio)
  César Zelaya (Real Sociedad)
  Emil Martínez (Marathón)
  José Tobías (Real Sociedad)

 3 goals:

  Jefferson Bernárdez (Parrillas One)
  Henrry Clark (Real Sociedad)
  Allan Alemán (Real España)
  Juan Rodríguez (Parrillas One)
  Leonardo Domínguez (Victoria)
  Marco Vega (Marathón)
  Ozzie Bodden (Victoria)
  Osman Melgares (Real Sociedad)
  Juan Mejía (Real España)
  Bryan Castro (Vida)
  Porciano Ávila (Parrillas One)
  Luis Guzmán (Parrillas One)
  Michael Montero (Vida)
  Rubén Licona (Victoria)

 2 goals:

  Jonathan Techera (Marathón)
  Léster Blanco (Real España)
  Aly Arriola (Deportes Savio)
  Pablo Rodríguez (Marathón)
  Ramiro Bruschi (Olimpia)
  Miguel Valerio (Vida)
  Wilson Güity (Real Sociedad)
  Franco Güity (Real España)
  Christian Alba (Vida)
  Júnior Padilla (Motagua)
  Jorge Cardona (Platense)
  César Oseguera (Motagua)
  Óscar Durón (Marathón)
  Wilmer Crisanto (Victoria)
  Johny Galdámez (Deportes Savio)
  Eder Arias (Victoria)
  Ángel Pineda (Deportes Savio)
  Mauricio Sabillón (Marathón)
  Mariano Acevedo (Olimpia)
  Víctor Ortiz (Victoria)
  Erick Norales (Vida)
  Alfredo Mejía (Motagua / Marathón)
  Misael Ruiz (Real Sociedad)
  Ney Costa (Deportes Savio)
  Mario Ventura (Parrillas One)
  Arnol Solórzano (Parrillas One)
  Randy Diamond (Platense)
  Sergio Peña (Real Sociedad)

 1 goal:

  Nery Medina (Olimpia)
  Rigoberto Padilla (Olimpia)
  Brayan Figueroa (Motagua)
  Henry Bermúdez (Olimpia)
  Anael Figueroa (Parrillas One)
  Irvin Reyna (Olimpia)
  José Casildo (Platense)
  Walter Martínez (Vida)
  Denis Suazo (Victoria)
  Irbin Guerrero (Platense)
  Júnior Izaguirre (Motagua)
  Mitchel Brown (Marathón)
  Cristian Lara (Platense)
  Kevin López (Motagua)
  Bryan Acosta (Real España)
  Omar Elvir (Motagua)
  Francisco Benítez (Deportes Savio)
  Melvin Valladares (Motagua)
  Francisco López (Victoria)
  Edder Arias (Victoria)
  Carlos Valle (Vida)
  Jonathan Posas (Parrillas One)
  Reynaldo Tilguath (Olimpia)
  Ronald García (Platense)
  Wilmer Fuentes (Marathón)
  Hilder Colón (Real España)
  Samuel Córdova (Victoria)
  Raúl Santos (Vida)
  Eduardo Sosa (Motagua)
  Bayron Méndez (Olimpia)
  Kevin Espinoza (Marathón)
  José Williams (Real Sociedad)
  Héctor Flores (Parrillas One)
  Bani Lozano (Platense)
  Johnny Calderón (Vida)
  Juan Montes (Motagua)
  Douglas Caetano (Olimpia)
  Marcelo Souza (Deportes Savio)
  Efraín López (Victoria)
  Selvin Castellanos (Parrillas One)
  Reinieri Mayorquín (Motagua)
  Christian Martínez (Vida)
  Jaime Rosales (Platense)
  Bryan Martínez (Victoria)
  Luis Maldonado (Marathón)
  Amado Guevara (Marathón)

 1 own goal:

  Rigoberto Padilla (Olimpia)
  Javier Estupiñán (Platense)
  Carlos Valle (Vida)
  Ozzie Bodden (Victoria)
  Dilmer Gutiérrez (Real Sociedad)
  Selvin Tinoco (Deportes Savio)
  Luis Castro (Motagua)

Aggregate table
Relegation was determined by the aggregated table of both Apertura and Clausura tournaments.  On 13 April 2014, Deportes Savio was relegated to Liga de Ascenso by finishing last with 37 points, 4 less than C.D. Marathón and C.D.S. Vida.

References

External links
 LNP Official

Liga Nacional de Fútbol Profesional de Honduras seasons
1
Honduras